Elias Nogueira António (born 30 May 1987) is an Angolan handball player for Madeira Andebol SAD and the Angolan national team.

He participated at the 2017 World Men's Handball Championship.

References

1987 births
Living people
Angolan male handball players
Handball players from Luanda
Expatriate handball players
Angolan expatriate sportspeople in Portugal